Hugh Price may refer to:

 Hugh Price (intelligence), former senior official in the Central Intelligence Agency
 Hugh Price (lawyer) (c. 1495–1574), Welsh lawyer and cleric; founder of Jesus College, Oxford
 Hugh Bernard Price (born 1941), U.S. activist for African-American causes
 Hugh H. Price (1859–1904), U.S. Representative from Wisconsin